Paradidyma melania is a species of bristle fly in the family Tachinidae. It is found in North America.

References

Further reading

 
 

Tachininae
Articles created by Qbugbot
Taxa named by Charles Henry Tyler Townsend
Insects described in 1919